This Man is Mine is a 1934 American pre-Code film directed by John Cromwell and starring Irene Dunne, Ralph Bellamy, and Constance Cummings. It is based on the play Love Flies in the Window by Anne Morrison Chapin.

Plot
Tony and Jim Dunlap are happily married. However, the dull-but-dependable Jim had been in love with Fran Harper, a school friend of Tony, before he and Tony married. Fran has just been divorced. Now Fran is coming their way, bringing her pick-up boyfriend Mort Holmes along, and she intends to steal Jim from Tony.

Tony sees Fran as a reminder of her own mother, who left Tony's father and caused him to drink himself to death. Thus, Tony is determined to avoid meeting Fran. However, they meet at the house of their friends, Jud and Bee McCrae, and Fran goes off with Jim after everyone has left. When Tony finds that Jim and Fran have been together, she threatens to divorce him. However, Tony eventually beats Fran at her own game, and wins Jim back.

Cast
 Irene Dunne as Tony Dunlap
 Constance Cummings as Francesca Harper
 Ralph Bellamy as Jim Dunlap
 Kay Johnson as Bee McCrae
 Charles Starrett as Jud McCrae
 Vivian Tobin as Rita
 Sidney Blackmer as Mort Holmes
 Louis Mason as Slim

References

External links
 
 
 
 

1934 films
Films directed by John Cromwell
1934 drama films
American black-and-white films
American drama films
1930s English-language films
1930s American films